The 2000 Australian Individual Speedway Championship was held at the Gosford Speedway in Gosford, New South Wales on 5 February.

After missing the 1999 championship at his home track, Leigh Adams was back to win his fifth Australian Championship taking him to outright second on the list of Australian Championship winners, just one behind the record held by the late Billy Sanders. Making it an all Victorian podium, Mark Lemon and Jason Lyons finished in second and third places after Lemon defeated Lyons in a runoff. Local rider and defending national champion Todd Wiltshire defeated Craig Watson to claim the final qualifying spot in the Overseas Final.

2000 Australian Solo Championship
 Australian Championship
 5 February 2000
  Gosford, New South Wales - Gosford Speedway
 Referee: 
 Qualification: The top four riders go through to the Overseas Final in Poole, England.

References

See also
 Australia national speedway team
 Sport in Australia

Speedway in Australia
Australia
Individual Speedway Championship